This article provides details of international football games played by the Switzerland national football team from 2020 to present.

Results

2020

2021

2022

2023

Head to head records

Notes

References

Football in Switzerland
Switzerland national football team
2020s in Swiss sport